Lahaina Banyan Court Park is a public park located at the corner of Front Street and Canal Street in the town of Lahaina, Hawaii, which was the capital of the Kingdom of Hawaii from 1820 to 1845. The  park, also known as Lahaina Courthouse Square and commonly called Banyan Tree Park, contains multiple heritage sites on the Lahaina Historic Trail, and a self-guided walking tour through the Lahaina Historic Districts.

The park occupies the site of the Old Lahaina Fort, originally built in 1831.  Hoapili, the Royal Governor of Maui, built the fort to protect the town from riotous sailors when Lahaina was used as an anchorage for the North Pacific whaling fleet. After the fort was demolished in 1854, a courthouse was built on the site. A portion of the old Lahaina Fort was reconstructed in 1964. The old Lahaina Courthouse was recognized as a contributing property of the Lahaina Historic District in 1965, and is currently used by the Lahaina Arts Society, Lahaina Restoration Foundation and the Lahaina Town Action Committee.

Sheriff William Owen Smith planted an Indian banyan tree in the courtyard square in 1873 to memorialize the 50th anniversary of the first American Protestant mission in Lahaina. The banyan tree has become the largest banyan tree in Hawaii, and one of the largest banyan trees in the United States. The park is managed by the County of Maui and the Lahaina Restoration Foundation.

Geography

Lahaina Banyan Court Park is located in the port of Lahaina town on the west side of the Hawaiian island of Maui.  The park square comprises  on the site of the old Lahaina Fort, directly across the street from the Lahaina small boat harbor. It is bounded by Hotel Street to the north, Canal Street to the south, Wharf Street to the west, and Front Street to the east.  Historic sites in the area include the former site of Lahaina's Beach—dredged during the construction of Lahaina's Harbor in 1955, the Pioneer Inn and the Keawaiki lighthouse to the north, and the campus of King Kamehameha III Elementary School—an archaeological site associated with the alii—to the south.

Background

New England whaling ships hunting sperm whales in the Pacific began to arrive in Hawaii in 1819, and many ships anchored in Honolulu and Lahaina. The impact of the whaling fleets on the Hawaiian Islands during the reign of Kamehameha III (1825–1854) shaped the entire Hawaiian economy and was the primary source of income for the islands until the discovery of oil in Titusville, Pennsylvania, in 1859 and the onset of the American Civil War (1861–1865).

Ships would generally seek repairs in Honolulu, but captains preferred anchoring off Lahaina because of its easy access from the Lahaina Roads and for the fresh provisions available in town.  According to Henry L. Sheldon, "the business of the entire population was the furnishing of supplies to whalers and entertaining the crews". Sailors who had been hunting whales for months at a time went to Lahaina to drink grog and meet women. Historian Noelani M. Arista notes that by 1825; 

a kapu prohibiting women from going out to ships for the purpose of prostitution was proclaimed by the ali'i (Hawaiian chiefs), altering that familiar traffic of the burgeoning Pacific seaport towns. Enraged that they could not cajole, coax, or coerce Hawaiian women into violating the kapu, the sailors turned their frustrations on the American missionaries, whom they blamed for the emergence of this new unreasonably strict moral law.

Whalers opposed any rules governing alcohol and prostitution, and blamed missionaries for influencing the Kingdom of Hawaii to enforce such rules. Riots broke out at least four times—in 1825, 1826, 1827, and 1843.  In the 1827 riots, the whaler  fired cannon shots over the home of missionary William Richards and threatened the safety of the community.

Lahaina Fort
The historic Fort at Lahaina, facing the Lahaina Harbor, is now represented by a partial reconstruction at the southern corner of the park. Lahaina Fort was demolished in 1854. However, in 1964, the State Parks Department reconstructed a part of old fort wall in the southwest corner of the park which was the venue for the 1961 feature film, The Devil at 4 O'Clock.

Lahaina was once the capital of Hawaii and residence of the royalty.

History

With the arrival of American whaling ships in Lahaina from 1819 and Kamehameha II reading in the town, the first missionaries also arrived in the town in 1820; Rev. C. S. Stewart and the Rev. William Richards came in 1823, and they were invited by Queen Mother Keopuolani.

With increasing conversions to Christianity the missionaries prevailed on Ulumāheihei Hoapili (1775–1840), the Governor of Maui, to promulgate laws to prohibit sale of liquor and banning native woman from soliciting by visiting the ships (women used to swim across to ships to meet the sailors) Initial measures taken by the Christian missionaries of the town by enforcing laws (a kapu, the ancient Hawaiian code of conduct of laws and regulations of Hawaii proclaimed in 1825) to prevent the native women visiting the ships or and to prevent the whaling community and sailors from visiting the town after nightfall, in pursuit of pleasure, embittered the sailors and whalers.

The "sea-bittered sailors" were not pleased with these stringent regulations, and in 1825 the English whaler Daniel caused rioting in the town for three days and even gave out life threats to Reverend William Richards.

Queen Kaʻahumanu (1768–1832), the regent of Kuhina Nui, who was a supporter of Rev. Richards, authorized Hoapili, the Governor of Maui to protect the town by building a fort. She visited Maui in February 1832, just months before she died, to support the construction of the fort to protect the town from whalers. Hoapili then got the fort built within a month. The fort was constructed from coral blocks with walls approximately 15–20 feet high topped with 47 cannons.  The sea men who did not conform to the evening curfew were imprisoned in the fort. A visitor noted:  "must be off to their ships, or into the fort", who also noted the condition of the sailors in the prison as: "caressed and hung upon by native girls, who flock here in the ship season, from other parts, to get the ready wages of sin."

Rioting occurred many times, and in one instance in 1827  cannonballs were reported to have been lobbed by the English whaler John Palmer. at the lawn of the Missionary house of William Richard. To prevent such incidents from recurring, Hoapili (1775–1840), the Governor of Maui, built a new fort replacing the original fort that was made of mud and sand.

In the period between 1830 and 1860, American whaling fleets frequented the Lahaina port town which resulted in growth of the economy of the island and brought about modernization. Enjoined with this development was the morality problems created by the visitors [whalers and sailors] because of their addiction to liquor and women. This became the cause for the clashes between the Christian missionaries who enforced what is termed as "blue laws". This caused the "boisterous" sea men to clash with the missionaries.

In 1841, American naval officer Charles Wilkes (1798–1877) who visited Lahaina Fort as commanding officer of the United States Exploring Expedition observed: "After the king's palace, the fort is the most conspicuous object: it is of little account, however, as a defence, serving chiefly to confine unruly subjects and sailors in. The area within is about one acre, and the walls are twenty feet high."

As the whaling industry declined and the California Gold Rush gained prominence in the late 1840s, Hawaii's population dropped, and infectious disease epidemics contributed to the loss of local populations. The fort was restored in 1847 but was now used more as a prison than for defending the Kingdom. The cannons were rusting and the fort was mostly empty of personnel except for a few soldiers and the Governor of Maui who lived there. When Henry Augustus Wise visited in 1848, he met James Young (1797–1851), then Governor of Maui, who was living in the fort.  Wise wrote that it was: 

an oddly assorted battery of some thirty pieces of artillery, of all sorts of carriages and calibre—long, short, and mediums; they command the usual anchorage, and no doubt do very well to prevent any acts of violence from merchant ships; but it is a question, if, at the second discharge of shot, they do not tumble to pieces.

An 1848 inventory lists 6 large cannons, 21 small cannons, 6 breech-loaders, and 8 which did not work. The fort stored quantities of gunpowder, guns, rifles, and swords, and was used as a prison. Sailors who docked at Lahaina were subject to a sunset curfew; it they did not return to their ship when the drums sounded they would be imprisoned in the fort.

The canons were seldom used for the intended purpose. However, they were used to provide gun salute every year on the occasion of the birthday of Kamehameha III. Another notable daily event at the fort was the beating of the drums at dusk by guards as a signal (a curfew) to the sailors on land to go back to their ships. This practice is recorded in detail by Jones as:

Seamen are obliged to be clear of the beach at drumbeat—eight o'clock in the evening.  No person is allowed to remain on shore over night, unless furnished with a proper pass by the captain of the port; and any one found on the beach, or in the town, with no pass, after the proper time, is marched to the calboose, where he is kept in confinement till morning, and then muleted in a pretty round sum for breaking the laws.  This is generally paid by the captain, and afterward, with pretty good interest, deducted from Jack's pay.

There was an ad in the Polynesian Newspaper announcing: "For Sale: A Quantity of Old Guns formerly mounted on the fort at Lahaina – can be seen at the fort in this city." 

In the 1850s, whaling began its steep decline. The forts in the Hawaiian Islands were in poor condition due to damage and neglect, and were either abandoned or removed.  The fort was demolished in 1854. The coral stones recovered from this demolition were reused elsewhere, and in building the new prison, Hale Paahao.

In 1964, the State Parks Department placed a reconstruction of the old fort wall in the southwest corner of the park.

Features
The fort was built in 1832 in a "quadrangular" shape covering an area of 1 acre. It was built with coral stones drawn from the coastal reef within 40 yards offshore into the sea. Defense reinforcements were provided on the top of the fort in the form of cannons; the canons were 47 numbers of different sizes, which had been recovered from the shipwrecks in various regions of Hawaii. The fort's location facilitated policing of the whale ships that were anchored at the harbour in large numbers.

In 1948, Henery Wise who visited Lahaina Fort, where the then governor was residing, noted:

[It is] a large square enclosure constructed of red coral rocks, banked up fifteen feet with earth , and mounting an oddly resorted battery of some thirty pieces of artillery, of all sorts of cartridges , and claibre long, short, and medium; they commanded the usual anchorage and no doubt very well to prevent any acts of violence from merchant ships; but it is a question, if, at the second discharging of shot, they do not tremble to pieces. There were a company of Hawaiian troops to man this fortress, who were well uniformed , and looked as well as Kanakas, or any other savages who have been accustomed half their lives to go naked can look when their natural ease of motion is cramped by European clothing.

With the decline of the whaling industry and the California Gold Rush, in the late 1840s, Hawaii's population dropped, and infectious disease epidemics contributed to the loss of local populations.

The restoration works carried out on the fort in 1947 involved addition of a powder magazine, removal of dilapidated parts of the bastions and building an additional wooden building for housing the office of the governor. The governor's residence on the ramparts of the fort was also renovated. A prison was also built within the fort, which consisted of four rooms. The refurbished fort was now used more as a prison than for defending the Kingdom. The cannons were rusting and the fort was mostly empty of personnel except for a few soldiers and the Governor of Maui who lived there.

In 1964, the State Parks Department reconstructed a part of old fort wall in the southwest corner of the park.

Lahaina Courthouse

On February 20, 1858, Lahaina experienced a violent hurricane that destroyed approximately twenty buildings, including the original courthouse at Hale Piula, initially intended as a  palace for Kamehameha III. The courthouse was rebuilt on the site of Lahaina Fort in 1859 using stones from Hale Piula. The new courthouse housed offices for customs, the postal service, the tax collector, the governor of Maui, a magistrates' court, a courtroom, and a jury room.  When the Kingdom was overthrown, the flag of Hawaii at the Lahaina Courthouse was lowered by the assistant postmaster on August 12, 1898, and the flag of the United States was raised in its place. The Hawaiian flag was placed on display in a permanent exhibit at the courthouse in September 2002. The post office at the courthouse replaced the Hawaiian stamp with the US stamp on June 14, 1900.

The courthouse was restored by architect William D'Esmond in 1925. D'Esmond added a new roof and redesigned the entryway and balcony. The building's tenants included the US Post Office and a tax office.  The courtroom was upstairs and the Lahaina jail was housed in the basement. The building was listed as a National Historic Landmark and a contributing property of the Lahaina Historic District in 1965, and was restored again in 1990. The courthouse now houses a museum, art galleries, a visitor center, a community meeting room, and public restrooms.  The Lahaina Heritage Museum opened upstairs in 2004 with interactive exhibits including videos, photographs, and historical objects.  The Lahaina Arts Council and the Lahaina Historic Society have offices in the courthouse.

Banyan tree

To memorialize the 50th anniversary of the first American Protestant mission in Lahaina, a banyan tree (Ficus benghalensis, Hawaiian: paniana) seedling was planted on April 24, 1873, in the courthouse square by sheriff William Owen Smith, who had received it as a gift from missionaries in India. The banyan, native to India, is one of 60 types of fig tree in the Hawaiian islands.

It is currently the largest banyan tree in Hawaii, and one of the largest banyan trees in the United States. The tree faces several threats, including soil compaction from foot and vehicle traffic due to tourism and special events in the park, drought, and the interruption of irrigation due to courthouse renovation. New restrictions were imposed in 2000 after the health of the tree began to decline. common myna birds (Acridotheres tristis) roost in the branches of the tree at sunset, causing a cacophony of bird cries as the evening approaches.

Administration, facilities, and events
The park is administered by the Maui Parks and Recreation department and maintained by the nonprofit Lahaina Restoration Foundation. Limited public parking is available on Front, Hotel, and Canal Streets, with very limited parking on Wharf Street as it is generally reserved for tour buses. All Banyan Tree Park events are hosted by The Lahaina Town Action Committee, which is in charge of the Visitor Center, 2nd Friday, Heui Craft Fairs and all festivals throughout the year including Halloween.

Halloween events in the park area, known as the "Mardi Gras of the Pacific", have long been a divisive issue between Maui County and the Cultural Resources Commission.

References

Bibliography

A Roving Printer. (1861). Life and Adventure in the South Pacific. New York: Harper and Brothers. 
Albers, D. Kahn, G. Swall-Bobay, L. (April 27, 2008). Our World: More than the light bulb. Naples Daily News. Retrieved November 19, 2014.
Arista, N. (2009). Listening to Leoiki: Engaging Sources in Hawaiian history. Biography. Project Muse. (32) 1, 66–73.
Atchison, M. (September 17, 2005). Maui town has solid roots. Toronto Star. 
Bradley, H. W. (1968) [1942]. The American Frontier in Hawaii: The Pioneers, 1780-1843. Gloucester: Peter Smith. [Stanford University Press]. 
Freidel, F. (1943). A Whaler in Pacific Ports, 1841-42. Pacific Historical Review. 12 (4), 380–390. 
Hurley, T. (April 22, 2001). There's life yet in the old banyan tree. The Honolulu Advertiser.
Judd, Walter F. (1975). Palaces and Forts of the Hawaiian Kingdom: From Thatch to American Florentine. Palo Alto, CA: Pacific Books. .
Kamakau, S. M. (1992) [1961]. Ruling Chiefs of Hawaii. Honolulu: The Kamehameha Schools Press. p. 356. .
Kashay, J. F. (August 2008). Competing Imperialisms and Hawaiian Authority: The Cannonading of Lāhainā in 1827. Pacific Historical Review. University of California Press.  77 (3), 369–390.  .
Kubota, G. T. (October 21, 2000b). Historic Lahaina banyan showing new growth: But experts still fear the long-term effects of a three-year drought. Honolulu Star-Bulletin.
Kubota, G. T. (September 21, 2002). Diary is a letter from old Maui. Honolulu Star-Bulletin.
Kubota, G. T. (August 7, 2004). Lahaina's famed banyan tree gets a rest. Honolulu Star-Bulletin.
Kupau, S. (2001). Exploring Historic Lahaina. Honolulu: Watermark Publishing. .
Loomis, I. (October 7, 2011a). Cultural panel 'frustrated'.  The Maui News.
Loomis, I. (October 23, 2011b). Suit seeks to stop Halloween celebration. The Maui News.
Masudo, S. Holl, H. H. (1960). Map of Historic Sites of Lahaina, Maui. In Maui Historical Society's Lahaina Historical Guide. Tokyo: Charles E. Tuttle, Co. 
Maui Historical Society. (1971) [1961]. Lahaina Historical Guide. Tokyo: Charles E. Tuttle, Co. 
Maui Parks and Recreation.  (2003). Lahaina Banyan Court Overview and Parking.  County of Maui.
Mills, P. R. (2002). Hawaii's Russian Adventure: A New Look at Old History.  Honolulu: University of Hawaii Press. .
"News from the Sandwich Islands. The New York Times. April 14, 1858.
Nickerson, R. (1980) [1978]. Lahaina: Royal Capital of Hawaii. Honolulu: Hawaiian Service. .
Pukui, M. K. Elbert, S. H. (1986). Hawaiian Dictionary. Honolulu: University of Hawaiʻi Press. .
Randall, C. E.  Clepper, H. E. (1976). Famous and Historic Trees. American Forestry Association. 
Rockett, L. (October 19, 2000). Burials found on school campus. Lahaina News.
Scott, S. (1991).Plants Introduced by Later Settlers. Plants and Animals of Hawaii. Bess Press, Inc. .
Speakman, C. E. (2001) (1978). Mowee: A History of Maui, the Magic Isle. Honolulu: Mutual Publishing. .
Smith, R. (1995). Hawaii: A Walker's Guide. Hunter Publishing, Inc. .
Taylor, A. P. (1929). Lahaina: The Versailles of Old Hawaii. Thirty-Seventh Annual Report of the Hawaiian Historical Society for the Year 1928.  Honolulu: Hawaiian Historical Society. 
United States Department of the Interior. National Park Service. (1974) [1962]. . National Register of Historic Places.
What's new on Maui.  Travel Weekly.  NorthStar Travel Media. 63 (45). November 8, 2004.
Wilkes, C. (1845). Chapter XXIX. Hawaiian Group, or Sandwich Islands. Narrative of the United States' Exploring Expedition.  London: Whittaker and Co. 
Wise, A. W. (1849). Los Gringos; or, An Inside View of Mexico and California with Wanderings in Peru, Chile, and Polynesia.  London: Richard Bently Publishers.

Further reading
Borthwick, D. F. Hammatt, H. H. (1999). Archaeological Investigations at Lahaina Court House, Lahaina District, Island of Maui.  Prepared for Mason Architects. Kailua: Cultural Surveys Hawaii.
Busch, B. C. (1993). Whalemen, Missionaries, and the Practice of Christianity in the Nineteenth-Century Pacific. Hawaiian Journal of History. 27, 94–95.
Dibble, S. (1843). History of the Sandwich Isles. Lahainaluna: Press of the Mission Seminary. 

Jacobsen, J. T. (1969). The Architectural Style Book for Lahaina.  Wailuku: Maui Historic Commission. 
Kubota, G. T. (June 7, 2000a). The famous Lahaina landmark appears to be suffering 'stress,' may be dying. Honolulu Star-Bulletin.
Kyselka, W., Lanterman, R. E. (1980). Maui: How it Came to Be. Honolulu: University of Hawaii Press. .
Mauka & Makai. Honolulu Advertiser. E3. October 14, 2007.
Miller, R. G. (1973). The Banyan Tree in Lahaina and William O. Smith.

Pierce, J. K. (1998). Shore leave. Historic Traveler. 4 (6), 50.

External links

Official site

Parks in Hawaii
Lahaina, Hawaii
Protected areas of Maui
Buildings and structures in Maui County, Hawaii
Christianity in Hawaii
Whaling in the Hawaiian Kingdom
Works Progress Administration in Hawaii
Museums in Maui County, Hawaii